Curuquetê River is a river of Amazonas state in north-western Brazil.

See also
List of rivers of Amazonas

References
Brazilian Ministry of Transport

Rivers of Amazonas (Brazilian state)